Blood on the Land is a 1966 Greek western drama film directed by Vasilis Georgiadis. Its subject is conflict between landowners and agricultural workers in Thessaly in the early 20th century. It was nominated for the Academy Award for Best Foreign Language Film.

Cast
 Nikos Kourkoulos as Odysseas Hormovas
 Mary Chronopoulou as Eirini
 Giannis Voglis as Rigas Hormovas
 Faidon Georgitsis as Giannos
 Zeta Apostolou
 Notis Peryalis as Marinos Antypas
 Eleni Kriti
 Angelos Antonopoulos as Kotsos
 Manos Katrakis as Father Hormovas
 Athinodoros Prousalis as a police officer

See also
 List of submissions to the 38th Academy Awards for Best Foreign Language Film
 List of Greek submissions for the Academy Award for Best Foreign Language Film

References

External links

1966 films
1966 Western (genre) films
Greek drama films
1960s Greek-language films
Films directed by Vasilis Georgiadis
Greek black-and-white films
Films set in Thessaly
Films set in Greece
Films shot in Thessaly
1966 drama films
Greek Western (genre) films